Rowland David Phillips (born 28 July 1965) is a Welsh former rugby union and rugby league footballer.

Background
Phillips was born in St Davids, Wales.

Playing career
He played as a back row forward for Wales, where he won ten caps between 1987 and 1990. He also played rugby union for Neath RFC before moving to rugby league, playing  for Warrington (Heritage No. 904), Oldham RLFC (Heritage № 1005) and Workington Town.

Rowland Phillips played as an interchange/substitute, i.e. number 15, (replacing  Neil Harmon on 79-minutes) in Warrington's 12–2 victory over Bradford Northern in the 1990–91 Regal Trophy Final during the 1989–90 season at Headingley, Leeds on Saturday, 12 January 1991.

He also played for the Wales and Great Britain national rugby league teams.

Rowland Phillips made his début for Warrington on Saturday 13 October 1990, and he played his last match for Warrington on Sunday 21 August 1994.

In 2003 he took over as coach of Neath RFC from Lyn Jones. Due to his success at the club he is regarded as a local hero, leading Neath RFC to four Premiership titles in successive years and three cup final wins.

In the Summer of 2009 he joined Ebbw Vale RFC as head coach. After an unsuccessful season which saw Ebbw Vale relegated, he joined new Italian rugby team Aironi, originally as a defence coach, a position he previously filled with the Ospreys and Wales. He became Head Coach on 7 November 2010 after Franco Bernini was sacked after not winning any of their games up to that point.

In July 2012 Phillips was appointed head coach of Italian club Viadana. In June 2014 Phillips was appointed Director of Rugby for Welsh club Neath RFC; he left later when appointed manager of London Welsh.

References

External links
(archived by web.archive.org) Profile at aironirugby.eu

1965 births
Officers in Welsh police forces
Living people
Aironi coaches
Dual-code rugby internationals
Great Britain national rugby league team players
London Welsh RFC players
Neath RFC players
Oldham R.L.F.C. players
People educated at Ysgol Dewi Sant
People from St Davids
Rugby league players from Pembrokeshire
Rugby league second-rows
Rugby union players from Pembrokeshire
Wales international rugby union players
Wales national rugby league team players
Warrington Wolves players
Welsh police officers
Welsh rugby league players
Welsh rugby union coaches
Welsh rugby union players
Workington Town players